Sangile is a 2019 Sri Lankan drama film directed by Lalith Pannipitiya and co-produced by G. Dharmarathna and K.G. Shirani Dias for JMV Films. It stars Dulani Anuradha and Saranga Disasekara in lead roles along with Sanath Gunathilake and Veena Jayakody. Music composed by Saman Panapitiya. It is the 1320th Sri Lankan film in the Sinhalese cinema.

The film has been shot around the Kalundewa village in Matale district in 2009. The production cost is 8 million SLR.

Plot
Sangele (Dulani) is a girl who lives alone in a village of people . People in the city are trying to get close to her some even making sexual advances. Punchi Malli (Sanath) is very attracted to Sangile, even though he is married. Meanwhile, a hard working young Sunimal (Saranga) falls in love with Sangile. Punchi Malli was falsely accused in due to a rumor and sent to jail. During this time, Punchi Malli raped Sangile and Punchi Malli's wife (Veena) get to know about the hidden truth. She tried to blame Sangile for dirty works, however Punchi Malli punished her. Sangile gets pregnant and story continues.

Cast
 Dulani Anuradha as Sangile
 Saranga Disasekara as Sunimal	
 Sanath Gunathilake as Punchi Malli		 
 Veena Jayakody as Punchi malli's wife		
 Rebeka Nirmali as Sangile's mother
 Wimal Kumara de Costa as Wimale
 Nalin Pradeep Udawela as Monk
 Vasanthi Chathurani as Lady monk	
 Kumuduni Adikari as Matchmaker	
 Neil Alles		
 Mohan Hettiarachchi		
 Lionel Wickrama as Village officer
 Anusha Sonali as Sun's ex-wife

Songs
The film consists with two songs.

References

External links
 
 Sangili on YouTube

2019 films
2010s Sinhala-language films